The action type approach is a series of pseudoscientific mental exercises that purport to increase physical performance in athletes.

References

Pseudoscience